Oopterus is a genus of beetles in the family Carabidae first described by Félix Édouard Guérin-Méneville in 1841.

Species 
Oopterus contains the following twenty-nine species:

 Oopterus anglemensis Larochelle & Larivière, 2017
 Oopterus arthurensis Larochelle & Larivière, 2017
 Oopterus clivinoides Guerin-Meneville, 1841
 Oopterus collaris Broun, 1893
 Oopterus corvinki Larochelle & Larivière, 2017
 Oopterus discoideus Larochelle & Larivière, 2017
 Oopterus frontalis Broun, 1908
 Oopterus fulvipes Broun, 1886
 Oopterus garnerae Larochelle & Larivière, 2017
 Oopterus laevicollis Bates, 1871
 Oopterus laeviventris (Sharp, 1883)
 Oopterus lewisi (Broun, 1912)
 Oopterus marrineri Broun, 1909
 Oopterus marrisi Larochelle & Larivière, 2017
 Oopterus mohiensis Larochelle & Larivière, 2017
 Oopterus monticola Larochelle & Larivière, 2017
 Oopterus nanus Larochelle & Larivière, 2017
 Oopterus nunni Larochelle & Larivière, 2017
 Oopterus ocularius (Broun, 1917)
 Oopterus palmai Larochelle & Larivière, 2017
 Oopterus patulus (Broun, 1881)
 Oopterus punctatus Larochelle & Larivière, 2017
 Oopterus quadripunctatus Larochelle & Larivière, 2017
 Oopterus sculpturatus Broun, 1908
 Oopterus sobrinus Broun, 1886
 Oopterus strenuus Johns, 1974
 Oopterus suavis Broun, 1917
 Oopterus taieriensis Larochelle & Larivière, 2017
 Oopterus trechoides Larochelle & Larivière, 2017

References

Trechinae